Austrocallerya megasperma, one of several species commonly known as native wisteria, is a species of flowering plant in the family Fabaceae and is endemic to eastern Australia. It is a woody climber with pinnate leaves and racemes of purple, pea-like flowers.

Description

Taxonomy
This species was first formally described in 1858 by Ferdinand von Mueller who gave it the name Wisteria megasperma in his Fragmenta Phytographiae Australiae from specimens he collected with Walter Hill near the Pine River. In 1994, Anne M. Schot moved the species to Callerya as Callerya megasperma in the journal Blumea and in 2019, James A. Compton and Brian David Schrire moved it to their new genus Austrocallerya as Austrocallerya megasperma, based on the plant's morphology, and nuclear and chloroplast DNA sequences. The specific epithet (megasperma) is derived from the Ancient Greek words megas "large" and sperma "seed", and refers to its large seeds.

Distribution
Austrocallerya megasperma grows in rainforest on the coast and nearby ranges of south-eastern Queensland and north-eastern New South Wales as far south as the Richmond River.

Ecology
This vine is a valuable indicator species as it often grows in association with the birdwing butterfly vine (Aristolochia praevenosa), one of the only food plants for the caterpillars of the rare Richmond birdwing butterfly (Ornithoptera richmondia). Austrocallerya megasperma itself is a food plant for the caterpillars of the pencilled blue (Candalides absimilis) and narrow-banded awl (Hasora khoda) butterflies.

Use in horticulture
Native wisteria is described as an attractive garden plant, but one that grows very rapidly when young and needs ample room to grow, and a structure which can bear its weight. It requires good drainage. It has been successfully cultivated in Melbourne, where it took 20 years to flower.

References

Wisterieae
Vines
Taxa named by Ferdinand von Mueller
Endemic flora of Australia
Plants described in 1858
Flora of New South Wales
Flora of Queensland